Gregg shorthand is a form of shorthand that was invented by John Robert Gregg in 1888.  Like cursive longhand, it is completely based on elliptical figures and lines that bisect them. Gregg shorthand is the most popular form of pen stenography in the United States; its Spanish adaptation is fairly popular in Latin America. With the invention of dictation machines, shorthand machines, and the practice of executives writing their own letters on their personal computers, the use of shorthand has gradually declined in the business and reporting world. However, Gregg shorthand is still in use today.

There is a reasonable possibility that John Robert Gregg structured his shorthand on the Mnemonic major system based on the previous work of Pierre Hérigone and others following the publication of The Anti-Absurd or Phrenotypic English Pronouncing and Orthographical Dictionary by Major Beniowski in 1845.

Many versions of this system were published. The last version was Centennial, published in 1988. Besides the main editions, a number of simpler, personal-use editions were published from 1924 to 1968. These included "Greghand" in 1935, and "Notehand" in 1960 and 1968.

Gregg is often contrasted to Pitman shorthand, as the two share significant predominance over other English shorthand systems.  Pitman uses line thickness and position to discriminate between two similar sounds, but Gregg shorthand uses the same thickness throughout and discriminates between similar sounds by the length of the stroke. John Robert Gregg was originally a teacher of a Duployan shorthand adaptation to English (Duployan shorthand was the dominant system in France, and also featured uniform thickness and attached vowels). However, he found the angular outlines of Duployan-based systems to be detrimental to speed. Gregg shorthand features cursive strokes which can be naturally blended without obtuse angles. In addition, because the symbols of Gregg shorthand are developed specially for English rather than adapted from a French system, they are a better fit for the language (for example, Gregg has a symbol for th ( and ) whereas the Duployan systems would use a dotted t, which takes longer to write).

Writing
Gregg shorthand is a system of phonography, or a phonemic writing system, which means it records the sounds of the speaker, not the English spelling. It uses the f stroke for the  sound in funnel, telephone, and laugh. All silent letters are omitted. The image on the right shows the strokes of Gregg Shorthand Simplified. The system is written from left to right and the letters are joined.  Sh (= ) (and zh = ), Ch (= ), and J (or Dzh, = ) are written downward, while t and d are written upward. X  is expressed by putting a slight backward slant on the s symbol, though a word beginning ex is just written as if spelt es (and, according to Pre-Anniversary, ox is written as if os). W when in the middle of a word, is notated with a short dash under the next vowel. Therefore, the digraph qu (= ) is usually written as k with a dash underneath the next vowel. In Anniversary and before, if z need be distinguished from s, a small tick drawn at a right angle from the s may be written to make this distinction. 

Many of the letters shown are also brief forms, or standard abbreviations for the most common words for increased speed in writing. For instance, instead of writing kan for "can", the Gregg stenographer just writes k. These brief forms are shown on the adjacent image.  There are several others not shown, however. For instance, "please" is written in Simplified and back as simply pl, and "govern" as gv.

Phrasing is another mechanism for increasing the speed of shorthand writing. Based on the notion that lifting the pen between words would have a heavy speed cost, phrasing is the combination of several smaller distinct forms into one outline. For example, "it may be that the" can be written in one outline, "(tm)ab(th)a(th)". "I have not been able" would be written, "avnba" (note that to the eye of the reader this phrase written in shorthand looks like "I-have-not-been-able", and so phrasing is far more legible than a longhand explanation of the principle may lead one to believe).

The vowels in Gregg shorthand are divided into groups that very rarely require further notation. The a is a large circle, and can stand for the sounds in trap , palm , and face . The e is a small circle, and can stand for the sounds in dress , fleece , kit , and nurse . ī represents the sound in price . The o is a small hook that represents the sounds in goat , lot , thought , and north . The u is a tiny hook that represents the sounds in strut , foot , and goose . It also expresses a w at the beginning of a word. In "Anniversary," short and long vowel sounds for e, a, o and u may be distinguished by a mark under the vowel, a dot for short and a small downward tick for long sounds.

There are special vowel markings for certain diphthongs.  The ow in how  is just an a circle followed by a u hook.  The io in lion , or any diphthong involving a long i and a vowel, is written with a small circle inside a large circle. The ia in piano  and repudiate  is notated as a large circle with a dot in its center. In Anniversary and back, if ea need be distinguished from ia, it is notated with a small downward tick inside the circle instead of the dot.  The u in united  is notated with a small circle followed by an u hook above it.

Due to the simple alphabet, Gregg shorthand is very fast in writing; however, it takes a great deal of practice to master it. Speeds of 280 WPM (where a word is 1.4 syllables) have been reached with this system before, and those notes are still legible to others who know the system.

Some left-handed shorthand writers have found it more comfortable to write Gregg shorthand from right to left. This "mirror writing" was practiced by a few people throughout the life of Gregg shorthand. However, left-handed writers can still write Gregg shorthand from left to right with considerable ease.

Versions
Throughout its history, different forms of Gregg shorthand have been published. All the versions use the same alphabet and basic principles, but they differ in degrees of abbreviation and, as a result, speed. The 1916 version is generally the fastest and most abbreviated version. Series 90 Gregg has the smallest degree of abbreviation, but it is also generally the slowest standard version of Gregg. Though each version differs in its level of abbreviation, most versions have expert and reporting versions for writers who desire more shortcuts.

Pre-Anniversary Gregg shorthand
Gregg Shorthand was first published in 1888 by John Robert Gregg; however, it was in a very primal stage, and therefore did not gain much success. Five years later, a much better version was published. This version was published in a second edition in 1893, then in a third edition titled "Gregg Shorthand" in 1897. The fourth edition, published in 1902, developed more shortcuts. The fifth edition, published in 1916,  is the version most commonly referred to as "Pre-Anniversary" Gregg shorthand; this version has the largest number of brief forms, phrases, and shortcuts.

Gregg Shorthand Anniversary Edition
In 1929 another version of Gregg shorthand was published. This system reduced the memory load on its learners by decreasing the number of brief forms and removing uncommon prefixes.  It was intended to have been published in 1928 on the 40th anniversary of the system, but it was published a year afterward due to a delay in its production.

Gregg Shorthand Simplified
Gregg Shorthand Simplified was published in 1949.  This system drastically reduced the number of brief forms that needed to be memorized to only 181.  Even with this reduction in the number of brief forms, one could still reach speeds upward of 150 WPM.  The system was simplified in order to directly address the need of business stenographers, who only needed to produce 100–120 WPM transcription.  The creator of an advanced reporting version of Gregg Shorthand, Charles Lee Swem, wrote in The National Shorthand Reporter, "An abbreviated, simplified edition of our system has been published and accepted for the purpose of training office stenographers, and not necessarily reporters."  He also advised, "I do not believe any young student should hesitate to study Simplified for fear it will jeopardize his chances of becoming a reporter.  It is fundamentally the same system as we reporters learned from the Anniversary edition.  Once Simplified is learned, the change-over to the reporting style is comparatively simple and can be made by any writer."

Gregg Shorthand Diamond Jubilee Edition
The Diamond Jubilee series was published through most of the 1960s and the 1970s (1963–1977).  It was simpler than the Simplified version, and reduced the number of brief forms to 129.  For Diamond Jubilee students who wanted to increase speed for reporting, an edition of "Expert" Diamond Jubilee was available to push speeds upward.

Gregg Shorthand Series 90
Series 90 (1978–1987) was an even simpler version, which used a minimal number of brief forms and placed a great emphasis on clear transcription, rather than reporting speed.  Although it introduced a couple of new abbreviations and reintroduced some short forms that were missing in Diamond Jubilee, it eliminated several other short forms, and was in the main simpler, longer, and slower than the previous editions. Shorthand was dwindling in popularity during this series' usage.

Gregg Shorthand Centennial Edition
Published in 1988, this is the most recent series of Gregg shorthand.  It was the only version since the Pre-anniversary edition of 1916 to increase the complexity of the system from the previous one, having 132 brief forms.

Other versions
The above versions of Gregg shorthand were marketed for professional use, such as business and court reporting. Gregg Shorthand Junior Manual, designed for junior high school students, was published in 1927 and 1929. Greghand, A Simple Phonetic Writing for Everyday Use by Everyone was published as a pamphlet in 1935. The 1960 and 1968 editions of Gregg Notehand focused on how to take effective classroom and personal notes using a simple form of Gregg shorthand.

Adaptations
Gregg shorthand has been adapted to several languages, including Afrikaans, Esperanto, French, German, Hebrew, Irish, Italian, Japanese, Polish, Portuguese,  Russian, Spanish, Catalan, Thai, and Tagalog.  With a few customizations, it can be adapted to nearly any language.  The Spanish version, designed by Eduardo Vega, is the most popular adaptation.

The Mandarin Chinese version slightly modified the original system, under the name Beifang Suji (北方
速記 Běifāng sùjì 'Northern Shorthand').

References

Further reading

 Reporter offers "a lesson in the lost technology of shorthand."

See also
 The Gregg Reference Manual

External links
 

 Internet Archives Public Domain Gregg Shorthand Novels and Manuals

Shorthand systems
Court reporting
Transcription (linguistics)
Writing systems introduced in 1888